The 2010–11 CWHL season  is the fourth in the history of the Canadian Women's Hockey League but was considered a reboot for the league after a major restructuring as an organization. For the season, the league was to run on a budget of $500,000 and players will pay for their own equipment.

As part of the restructuring, officially, all five CWHL teams in the 2010–11 season were referred to by the league as their locations without any monikers and were considered "new" teams. However, since most of the locations had teams in the previous seasons, they were still commonly referenced as their monikers. The league returned to the team name usage for the following season.

Offseason
Prior to the season, the league underwent a structural reorganization. The CWHL considered the restructure a relaunch of the league. Among the changes included the Mississauga Chiefs, Ottawa Senators and Vaughan Flames teams ceasing operations, adding a new team in Toronto, and expanding into the United States with a team in Boston. The relaunch also branded the five teams after their respective locations, simply calling them Boston CWHL, Brampton CWHL, Burlington CWHL, Montreal CWHL, and Toronto CWHL. However, the CWHL teams that were playing in previous markets were commonly referred to as their former names, the Boston team called itself the Boston Blades, and the new Toronto team was sometimes called Toronto HC.

The league held its first player draft on August 12, 2010, although it was only for the three Greater Toronto Area teams as the league decided that since they do not pay a salary, it would be unfair to force players to be based outside their hometown.  The event was held at the Hockey Hall of Fame in Toronto.

On September 11, the Centre Etienne Desmarteau in Montreal, Quebec, named one of the rinks in the arena in Caroline Ouellette's honour.

On September 17, former New Hampshire goaltender Erin Whitten was named head coach of the Boston expansion franchise.

News and notes
November 20–21: Montreal swept Brampton in a two-game series. The battle between the top two teams in the Canadian Women's Hockey League resulted in Montreal remaining undefeated. The November 20 game involved a pre-game salute. Montreal recognized Angela James, the head coach of Brampton for her historic induction into the Hockey Hall of Fame, and held a minute of silence for the passing of Pat Burns at the Étienne Desmarteau Arena.
December 19: Boston came from behind to defeat Montreal. In doing so, they broke up Montreal's bid for an undefeated season.  Boston goalie Mandy Cronin stopped 74 shots to lead Boston to victory. Montreal had an early 2-0 lead. In the second period, Blades' player Sam Faber scored on an assist by Jess Koizumi. In the third period, Koizumi would tie the game. With 3:24 to play in the game, Angela Ruggiero scored the game-winning goal. She was assisted by Sam Faber and Haley Moore.
January 16: Gillian Apps scored her seventh goal of the season 2:42 into overtime as Brampton defeated Boston by a 4–3 tally. The win was the fifth in a row for Brampton and 11–6 on the season. The five game win streak was the best in the league. Brampton had yet to lose a game in 2011. In addition, they outscored their opponents 23–9 during the streak.
January 18, 2011: Brampton competed against Montreal at the Invista Centre in Kingston, Ontario. This was team captain Jayna Hefford's hometown and her number 15 was raised to the rafters of the Invista Centre on behalf of the Kingston Area Minor Hockey Association. As of 2012, no sweaters bearing Hefford's number will be used in Kingston Minor Hockey.

January 21: Georgetown, Ontario, hosted a game between Brampton and Toronto. The game featured eight former Olympians (from Brampton, Gillian Apps, Jayna Hefford, Lori Depuis, Delaney Collins and Molly Engstrom, and from Toronto, Sami Jo Small, Tessa Bonhomme and Jennifer Botterill). Brampton prevailed by a 5–2 tally.
January 29: Montreal raised awareness and funds for the Fondation du cancer du sein du Québec (FCSQ). The game featured the Montreal club in pink at Centre Etienne Desmarteau versus Boston. Montreal prevailed by a 3–0 score (goals scored by: Stephanie Denino, Sarah Vaillancourt and Tawnya Davis). 800 persons came to support the cause.
February 12: Brampton topped Boston for tenth straight victory, Montreal and Toronto win one game each.
February 19: at the Mastercard Centre, Toronto faced off against Montreal for a special event for the Canadian National Institute for the Blind. There were over 500 people in attendance and many fun events for all those involved.
February 27: For their last match of the regular season, Montreal ended up on the winning side, defeating Boston 4–1 solidifying their hold on first place in the league.

Team captains

Board of directors
January 25, 2011: The CWHL announced its board of directors for the upcoming season.

Final standings
Note: GP = Games played, W = Wins, L = Losses, OTL = Overtime Losses, SOL = Shootout Losses, GF = Goals for, GA = Goals against, Pts = Points.

Statistics

Scoring leaders

Goaltending leaders

Attendance

Awards and honors
Source:
 Most Valuable Player: Caroline Ouellette, Montréal
 Angela James Bowl: Top Scorer Caroline Ouellette, Montréal
 Outstanding Rookie: Sarah Vaillancourt, Montréal
 Coach of the Year: Patrick Rankine, Montréal

CWHL Top Players
 Top Forward: Caroline Ouellette, Montréal
 Top Defender: Angela Ruggiero, Boston
 Top Goaltender: Kim St-Pierre, Montréal

CWHL All-Stars
First Team All-Stars
 Goaltender: Kim St-Pierre, Montreal
 Defender: Angela Ruggiero, Boston
 Defender: Annie Guay, Montreal
 Forward: Caroline Ouellette, Montreal
 Forward: Jayna Hefford, Brampton
 Forward: Sarah Vaillancourt, Montreal
Second Team All-Stars
 Goaltender: Laura Hosier, Brampton
 Defender: Britni Smith, Toronto
 Defender: Molly Engstrom, Brampton
 Forward: Jennifer Botterill, Toronto
 Forward: Sam Faber, Boston
 Forward: Noemie Marin, Montreal

CWHL All-Rookie Team
 Goaltender: Christina Kessler, Burlington
 Defender: Britni Smith, Toronto
 Defender: Kacey Bellamy, Boston
 Forward: Sarah Vaillancourt, Montreal
 Forward: Sam Faber, Boston
 Forward: Kori Cheverie, Toronto

CWHL Monthly Top Scorer
 October: Noémie Marin, Montreal
 November: Caroline Ouellette, Montreal
 December: Caroline Ouellette, Montreal
 January: Caroline Ouellette, Montreal
 February: Caroline Ouellette, Montreal

Postseason
Brampton travelled to Montreal and Toronto went to Boston for the first round of the playoffs. Montreal and Toronto won each of their matches against their opponents to participate in the Clarkson Cup Championship.

Clarkson Cup
The 2011 Clarkson Cup was held March 24–27, 2011. The four competing teams included three from the Canadian Women's Hockey League and the champion team of the Western Women's Hockey League, the Minnesota Whitecaps.

Championship game 
March 27: The final game concluded with the Montreal team defeating Toronto 5–0. Montreal got off to a 2–0 lead in the first period with the first goal scored by Noemie Marin on a backhand shot as she converted a pass from Caroline Ouellette and the second goal scored off a face off in the Toronto end when Dominique Thibault took the draw and Vanessa Davidson put a shot behind goaltender Sami Jo Small. The lone goal of the second period was scored by Sabrina Harbec on an outside drive cutting by Annie Guay. Harbec drew the goalie across the crease and put the puck in the top corner. The shots at the end of the second period were 34 to 17 in favour of the Montreal.

Montreal added two more goals in the third period to win 5–0. At 5:33, Julie Chu passed to Caroline Ouellette and made a low shot for a goal. The final goal of the game was scored with 2:42 left as Sarah Vaillancourt picked up a pass from Ouellette and scored from about five feet out. Toronto goalie Sami Jo Small played well in defeat as Montreal controlled the game outshooting Toronto 51 to 26. Toronto did threaten offensively early in the game and could have turned the contest around but Montreal goalie, Kim St-Pierre, came up with exceptional saves to earn the shutout and ultimately crown Montreal Stars as the 2011 Clarkson Cup Champions.

Awards and honors

See also
 2010–11 Boston Blades season
 2010–11 Montreal Stars season
 2011 Clarkson Cup

References

External links
 CWHL.ca

External news story
 Cassie Campbell-Pascall, 2010 helped grow women's hockey on  CBC Sports, February 9, 2011.
   Montreal hopes Clarkson Cup win promotes women's hockey league in Globe and Mail, March 27, 2011

 
1